County Hospital is a Laurel and Hardy short film made in 1932. It was directed by James Parrott, produced by Hal Roach and distributed by Metro-Goldwyn-Mayer. Ollie is in hospital with a broken leg, Stan comes to visit and ends up getting Ollie kicked out; on the way home Stan crashes the car.

Plot
Ollie is in the county hospital with a broken leg. Stan pays him a visit (he did not have anything else to do) bearing a "thoughtful" gift of a bag of hard-boiled eggs and nuts. Ollie complains he cannot eat hard-boiled eggs or nuts and asks Stan why he did not bring a box of candy. Stan explains boxes of candy cost too much and that Ollie did not pay him for the last box he had brought him. While eating an egg, Stan knocks over a jug of water and Ollie hits him on the head with a bedpan.

The doctor (Billy Gilbert) comes in to examine Ollie and tells him he should be in the hospital for at least two months. In a slapstick sequence, Stan uses the traction weight to break a nut and Ollie's plastered leg hits the doctor on the head. The doctor grabs the weight in anger and falls out of the window. Ollie's leg flies up to the ceiling as the doctor dangles precariously.

The angry doctor orders both patient and guest out of the hospital at once. "You had nothing else to do so you thought you'd come around and see me," says an irritated Ollie. "Here I was for the first time in my life having a nice peaceful time and you had to come and spoil it. Get my clothes." Before leaving, Stan first manages to destroy a pair of trousers belonging to Ollie's roommate (who is also going home) and then accidentally sits on a hypodermic needle loaded with sedative. The nurse comes in, discovers this and nearly collapses into hysterical laughter.

Stan attempts to drive Ollie home, but is nearly asleep at the wheel due to the sedative, and the car careens wildly through the streets in a token comic "reckless driving" sequence of traffic chaos until Stan finally smashes the car between two streetcars, bending it into a 90 degree angle so that he can only drive round and round in circles.

Cast

Filming locations
The front-entrance facade of Culver City's 1928 City Hall building at 9770 Culver Blvd. was used as the exterior of the "County Hospital" where Stan Laurel makes an unwelcome visit to the recuperating Oliver Hardy. The facade of the City Hall was salvaged as the freestanding frontispiece of its 1995 replacement.

Filming locations for the final car sequence included Culver Boulevard, Duquesne Avenue, Tilden Avenue, Washington Boulevard, West 48th Street, and Second Avenue.

References

External links 
 
 
 
 

1932 films
1932 comedy films
American black-and-white films
1930s English-language films
Films directed by James Parrott
Films set in hospitals
Laurel and Hardy (film series)
Metro-Goldwyn-Mayer short films
Films with screenplays by H. M. Walker
1932 short films
American comedy short films
1930s American films